Popovice is a municipality and village in Benešov District in the Central Bohemian Region of the Czech Republic. It has about 300 inhabitants.

Administrative parts
Villages and hamlets of Kamenná Lhota, Kondratice, Mladovice, Pazderná Lhota and Věžníčky are administrative parts of Popovice.

References

External links

Villages in Benešov District